Walter Wilson Froggatt (13 June 1858 – 18 March 1937) was an Australian economic entomologist.

Early life
Froggatt was born in Melbourne, Victoria, the son of George Wilson Froggatt, an English architect, and his wife Caroline, daughter of Giacomo Chiosso, who came from a noble Italian family. As a child Froggatt, who was delicate, was encouraged by his mother to find interests in the open air and at an early age began collecting insects. The family having moved to Bendigo, Victoria he was educated at the Corporate High School, Sandhurst (Bendigo), and on leaving school spent four years on the land. In 1880 he went to a goldfield near Milparinka, New South Wales, and then worked his way northward and through Queensland to Mackay, Herberton, Cairns and other parts of the colony. Wherever he went he kept up his collecting of insects.

Career as entomologist
In 1883 Froggatt returned to Bendigo, worked with his father on a lease near Mount Hope, and around this time contacted Charles French Senior and Baron von Mueller. It was partly through Mueller's good offices that Froggatt was appointed entomologist and assistant zoologist to the expedition sent to New Guinea in 1885 by the Geographical Society of Australasia. The party left in June 1885 and returned on 4 December 1885. Early in 1886 Froggatt was engaged by William Macleay as a collector. He at once proceeded to North Queensland and formed large collections. In March 1887 he went to north-west Australia, began collecting in the Derby district and later in the more inland country. He returned to Derby after severe attacks of fever and then went to the Barrier Range to recover his health. Returning to the coast he took steamer on 22 February 1888 for Fremantle and thence to Sydney, where he arrived on 31 March 1888. Froggatt then went to England at the invitation of an uncle and gained much experience in European museums and universities. On his return he worked at the Macleay museum until it was transferred to the university, and in 1889 was appointed assistant and collector at the Sydney technological museum. From 1890 the first of a long series of papers by him was published in the Proceedings of the Linnean Society of New South Wales. Froggatt was a founder in 1891 and later president for a record eleven years of the Naturalists' Society of New South Wales. In 1896 he was appointed government entomologist to the agricultural department of New South Wales.

Froggatt’s work was not confined to entomology, he was also vine inspector and later inspector under the vegetation diseases act. In the many papers he was writing at this time there is an increasing tendency for his attention to be given to insect pests. He published Australian Insects in 1907, the first comprehensive text-book on Australian entomology, and in this year was sent abroad to study the best ways of dealing with fruit flies, etc. His Report on Parasitic and Injurious Insects was published by the New South Wales department of agriculture in 1909. Also in 1909 he went to the Solomon Islands to report on pests attacking coconut palms and sugar-cane, and in 1913 went on a similar mission to the New Hebrides. From 1911 to 1921 he lectured at the University of Sydney. During the war he spent much time on the control of weevils in stored wheat, and in 1922 investigated pests attacking banana-trees in Queensland. He retired from the department of agriculture in 1923 but was forest entomologist in the department of forestry until his final retirement on 31 March 1927. His volume on Forest Insects of Australia was published in 1923; in the following four years many papers on forest entomology were also published, and in 1927 another volume, Forest Insects and Timber Borers, appeared.

Late life and legacy

In Froggatt’s last years he did much writing on popular science in the Sydney Morning Herald, in 1933 his The Insect Book, the first of a series of elementary "Nature Books" for children, was published at Sydney, and in 1935 Australian Spiders and Their Allies appeared. During his final years, Froggatt was the only solid public opponent of the ultimately disastrous introduction of the poisonous cane toad into Queensland to control beetle pests in sugar cane – a view which cost him many supporters in the CSIR, among fellow economic entomologists (e.g. the HSPA's Cyril Pemberton) and even in the newspapers of the day.

He died at Croydon, New South Wales, on 18 March 1937 and was cremated with Anglican rites. He married Ann Emily, daughter of John Lewis, in 1890, and was survived by a son, John Lewis Froggatt, entomologist to the Mandated Territory of New Guinea, and two daughters. One of the daughters, Gladys Harding Froggatt, was the author of The World of Little Lives (1916), and More About the World of Little Lives (1929).

Froggatt was a member of the council of the Linnean Society of New South Wales for 40 years, president from 1911 to 1913. He gave enthusiastic support to the various scientific societies with which he was connected, and was much interested in the planting of Australian trees and in gardening generally. He had a fine collection of books on science and general literature. His collection of insects was acquired by the Commonwealth government and is now at Canberra. He was a leading Australian entomologist and an untiring worker; Musgrave lists over 300 of his papers in his Bibliography. In addition to his books on entomology, Froggatt also published a volume on Some Useful Australian Birds in 1921.

Froggatt specialised in Scale insects (Coccoidea).

Works
Partial list
 Notes on Australian Cynipidae, with descriptions of several new species. Proc. Linn. Soc. N. S. W. 7: 152–156 (1892).
Insects living in figs, with some account of caprification. Agric. Gaz. N. S. W. 11: 447–456, 1 pl. (1900).
with Frederic Webster Goding, F. W. Monograph of the Australian Cicadidae. Proceedings of the Linnean Society of New South Wales 29(3): 561–670. (1904).
 The insects of the Kurrajong (Brachychiton populaneum). Agric. Gaz. N. S. W. 16: 226–234, 2 pls (1905).
Australian Insects. 8vo. Pp. i–xiv, 1–449, 37 pls. Sydney.(1907).
A new parasite on sheep-maggot flies. Notes and description of a chalcid parasite (Chalcis calliphorae). Qld. Agric. J. 6: 177–179 (1916).
The Appleleaf Jassid (Empoasca australis). Agricultural Gazette of New South Wales 29: 568–570. (1918).
The digger chalcid parasite (Dirrhinus sarcophagae sp. n. on Sarcophaga aurifrons). Agric. Gaz. N. S. W. 30: 853–855 (1919).
Sheep-maggot flies and their parasites. Agric. Gaz. N. S. W. 32: 725–731, 807–813 (1921). Hathitrust link
Notes on the Spiny Green Phasma (Extatosoma tiaratum). Australian Naturalist, Sydney, iv, 16, 1 October, pp. 235–237 (1921)
Description of a new phasma belonging to the genus Extatosoma. Proc. Linn. Soc. NSW, 47: 344–345, pl. 38.(1922)Online
Forest Insects of Australia. 8vo. Sydney. Pp. i–viii, 1–171, 2 col. pls., 44 full pls., 33 text-blocks. (1923)
Forest insects and timber borers. Privately Published iv +107 pp. (1927).

Legacy and Memoria
He lived in 24 froggatt crescent croydon nsw 2132, and the Froggatt Prize for Science at the Presbyterian Ladies' College, Sydney (the school which Froggatt's daughters attended) are named in his honour.

The Froggatt Awards are named in his honor, and are awarded by the Invasive Species Council of Australia.

The insect genus Froggattisca is named after him.

References

Howard, L. O. 1930: History of applied Entomology (Somewhat Anecdotal). Smiths. Miscell. Coll. 84 X+1-564.
Musgrave, A. 1937: [Froggatt, W. W.]  Proc. R. Zool. Soc. N.S. Wales Sydney 1936/37 43–44, Portr.

D. I. McDonald, 'Froggatt, Walter Wilson (1858–1937)', Australian Dictionary of Biography, Volume 8, MUP, 1981, pp. 591–592. Retrieved on 26 October 2008

1858 births
1937 deaths
People from Melbourne
Australian entomologists
Australian geologists
Australian people of English descent
Australian people of Italian descent